Getback is the third studio album from Little Brother, released on October 23, 2007. Eleven days prior, Phonte leaked the album himself to Okayplayer.com

Details
The group has confirmed the involvement of several outside producers, in addition to 9th Wonder.  These include Nottz (who previously collaborated with the group on the Justus League album, Soldiers of Fortune), Illmind (who has contributed to their mixtape albums), Hi-Tek, and Denaun Porter. Low Budget producer, Oddisee was supposed to make a contribution, however, the group wrapped up the album before finally meeting up with him.

The songs recorded and confirmed include four Nottz produced songs, and four Illmind produced songs, along with one 9th Wonder produced song.  This caused many to speculate about 9th Wonders' role within the group, some even suggesting that he may have left the group entirely.  Asked for clarification, 9th responded:

Fan reaction to this news has been mixed, with some welcoming the new changes, and many others calling for greater involvement from 9th.  Nonetheless, the album still had an overall positive outlook from critics. In a drastic turn of events, the group announced in January, 2007 that they would be parting ways with both Atlantic Records, and their longtime producer 9th Wonder, due to creative differences but in both cases, on amicable terms. Rapper Big Pooh was quoted as saying:

Little Brother has decided, in the best interest of the group, for Little Brother and 9th Wonder to part ways. There are no hard feelings and no beef. This is just a decision that had to be made so all three of us could move forward and continue to provide the world with dope music.

Track listing

Personnel
Design – Frank William Miller, Junior
Executive-Producer – Beni B, Little Brother, Mischa "Big Dho" Burgess
Mastered By – Dave Cheppa
Recorded & Mixed By – Khrysis
Photography By – Jati Lindsay

References

External links
Getback review at theotalks.net

2007 albums
Little Brother (group) albums
Albums produced by 9th Wonder
Albums produced by Nottz
Albums produced by Mr. Porter
Albums produced by Hi-Tek
Albums produced by Illmind
Albums produced by Khrysis